This is an incomplete list of films shot in Big Bear Valley in the U.S. state of California.

Films

References

Films shot in California
Big Bear Valley
Lists of films shot in the United States
Films shot in Big Bear Lake, California